The 2010–11 Odessa Jackalopes season was the 10th season of the CHL franchise in Odessa, Texas.

Regular season

Conference standings

Awards and records

Awards

Milestones

Transactions 

The Jackalopes have been involved in the following transactions during the 2010–11 season.

Trades

Roster 

§ - assigned by the Bridgeport Sound Tigers (AHL)
Δ - signed to Amateur Tryout Contract
€ - emergency backup goaltender
♯ - signed to 5-game contract

Affiliates 
 NHL - New York Islanders
 AHL - Bridgeport Sound Tigers

See also 
 2010–11 CHL season

References

External links 
 2010–11 Odessa Jackalopes season at Pointstreak

O
O